A partial lunar eclipse took place on Tuesday, March 22, 1932. It was the first of 2 nearly total eclipses. The second lunar eclipse of such happened on September 14. This lunar eclipse of Saros cycle 131 preceded the first total eclipse on April 2, 1950.

Visibility

Related lunar eclipses

Saros series

See also
List of lunar eclipses
List of 20th-century lunar eclipses

Notes

External links

1932-03
1932 in science